Count Arvid Rutger Fredriksson Posse (15 February 1820 – 24 April 1901) was the prime minister of Sweden from 1880 to 1883.

Family background and education
Posse was born at Rosendal manor in Malmöhus County, as the son of Governor Count Fredrik Posse and Baroness Magdalena Charlotta Bennet. In 1835 he enrolled at Lund University, receiving a law degree in 1840. The same year, he began as a trainee at the Court of Appeal of Skåne and Blekinge (Hovrätten över Skåne och Blekinge), during which time he worked both at district courts and at the Court of Appeal itself. Later, he was appointed assistant district judge (vice häradshövding) and in 1846 a clerk at the Court of Appeal, and in 1847 was made an associate justice at the court. In 1849 Posse left public service and resettled at Charlottenlund Manor and devoted his time to agriculture, enterprise and local politics (being, e.g., 1865–68 the president of Malmöhus County Council).

Political career
Posse began his political career as a member of the House of Nobility at the Parliament of 1856–58. He was then the Chairman of the Banking Committee (Bankoutskottet). In the Parliament of 1862-63 he chaired the Appropriations Committee (Bevillningsutskottet), where he was a strong proponent of the principles of free trade, which he would remain throughout his life. During this Parliament, he seriously objected to proposed amendments to the Law on Local Self-Government concerning proposed restrictions on the vote shares of larger land-owners. He feared, among other things, that the amendments, if adopted, could undermine the proposed electoral reform. Posse himself, however, did not support the reform. On the contrary, he was one of the most ardent opponents of the reform and predicted at the Parliament of 1865–66, when he was Chairman of the Committee on Government Affairs (Statsutskottet), that the fatherland would meet with an unhappy future if the reform were carried through. Among other things, he feared the new electoral system would put too much power into the hands of the agrarian interests, who would soon forget "the many things that have to live both above and beside them". Notwithstanding this statement, at the first session of the Riksdag's Second Chamber in 1867, Posse became the self-appointed spokesman for the agrarian group, effectively making him the indisputed leader of the new Second Chamber. From this group was formed the Lantmanna Party, which, with Posse as leader, soon adopted an oppositional stance towards the Government. For a number of years Posse remained unquestionably the most prominent and powerful personality in Parliament, even if not the most charismatic.

During 1867–1881 Posse was a member of the Second Chamber, representing the district of Herrestad och Ljunit Hundreds, outside Ystad. In 1867-75 he was Chairman of the Committee on Government Affairs (at the Extra Parliament of 1871 he was the Vice Chairman of the Select Committee (Särskilda utskottet)). As Speaker 1876-1880 he was in charge of the business of the Second Chamber. He entered government on 19 April 1880, being appointed Prime Minister, following the resignation of Baron Louis De Geer. Additionally Posse was Minister of Finance from 7 December 1880 to 8 March 1881.

Prime minister and administrative court president
As prime minister, Posse now had to solve the important issues that had been on the agenda since the reform of Parliament. The issues concerned the proposed abolition of both the allotment system and the land taxes (grundskatter) as part of a re-organization of the military. The odds seemed to be in favor of success, since it was believed that he could count on support from old party friends, and among the opponents of the preceding governments. Large committees were appointed to report on the issues. At the Parliament of 1883 the Posse Government tabled their proposals. They promised a step-by-step removal of the land taxes, and the tenement and allotment duties. In return the Posse wanted Parliament to approve the Government's proposals to establish a military based partly on permanently drafted soldiers (enrolled voluntarily and paid by the state) and partly on conscription. However, the Upper House's insistence on retaining the allotment system, and, perhaps more importantly, the Lantmanna Party's cutbacks, led to a series of dramas and a defeat for Posse, following which he resigned as Prime Minister on 13 June 1883. He was then appointed President of the Administrative Court of Appeal, which he remained until 1889.

Political and scientific work
As member of the First Chamber for South Kalmar County 1882–1890, Posse kept a low profile, but opposed the introduction of grain tariffs during the 1887 struggle between free traders and protectionists. He also expressed his sympathies for a moderate suffrage reform. When speaking in Parliament, Posse expressed himself succinctly and clearly, often emphatically but always with calm and dignity. He was elected a member of the Royal Swedish Academy of Agriculture and Forestry (1879) and an honorary member of the Royal Physiographical Society in Lund (1878) and the Royal Naval Officers' Society (1880). He died on 24 April 1901 in Stockholm.

This article is translated from the equivalent Swedish-language Wikipedia article, which incorporates text from Nordisk familjebok, published 1904–1926, now in the public domain.

Relative
In 1912, his niece, Sigrid Lindström (née Posse) (1856–1946), survived the sinking of RMS Titanic as a first-class passenger.

References 

1820 births
1901 deaths
People from Helsingborg Municipality
Prime Ministers of Sweden
Swedish Ministers for Finance
Swedish counts
19th-century Swedish politicians
Members of the Första kammaren
Speakers of Andra kammaren
Members of the Royal Physiographic Society in Lund